Laurel School District is a public school district in Laurel, Delaware, United States.

In addition to Laurel it serves Bethel.

Schools
 High school
 Laurel High School

 Middle schools
 Laurel Middle School

 Elementary schools
 North Laurel Elementary School

Previous schools
 Paul Laurence Dunbar Elementary School (closed 2019)

References

School districts in Sussex County, Delaware